Alto Adige or South Tyrol is a province in northern Italy. 

Alto Adige may also refer to:
 Alto Adige (newspaper), an Italian newspaper
 Alto Adige (district), a district in the Department of Benaco in the Cisalpine Republic, 1797–1798
 Department of Alto Adige, a department of the Napoleonic Kingdom of Italy, 1810–1814
 F.C. Südtirol, a football club based in the city of Bolzano also previously known as F.C. Südtirol - Alto Adige